This is a list of events from British radio in 1947.

Events

January
 2 January – Much-Binding-in-the-Marsh, starring Kenneth Horne and Richard Murdoch, having started out as a recurring sketch in the wartime comedy-variety show Merry-Go-Round (from 31 March 1944), debuts on the BBC Light Programme, continuing in various formats until 1954.

February
 21 February – Two issues of Radio Times are missed due to the winter 1946–47 fuel shortage greatly exacerbated by severe weather. (BBC television is suspended 10 February–11 March.)

March
 28 February – The UK version of Twenty Questions is launched on BBC radio, originally presented by Stewart MacPherson with a panel comprising Richard Dimbleby, Jack Train, Anona Winn and Joy Adamson and with Norman Hackforth as the mystery voice.

April
 9 April – How Does Your Garden Grow? debuts on BBC radio; as Gardeners' Question Time it will still be running more than 65 years later.

May to September
No events.

October
 6 October – Philip Odell, a fictional detective created by Lester Powell and played by Canadian actor Robert Beatty, is heard for the first time on BBC radio in Lady in a Fog.
 24 October – Francis Poulenc's Sinfonietta receives its world premiere in a broadcast concert from London having been commissioned by the BBC for the first anniversary of their Third Programme.

November
 18 November – The BBC links up with stations around the globe in the programme BBC Covers the World.
 20 November – The Princess Elizabeth (later Elizabeth II), daughter of George VI marries The Duke of Edinburgh at Westminster Abbey, London. The service is broadcast on BBC radio.
 Gracie Fields hosts Our Gracie's Working Party on BBC radio; in the series, she visits twelve towns (beginning with her native Rochdale), compering and performing in a live show of music and entertainment, with local talents on the bill.

December
No events.

Debuts
 28 February – Twenty Questions (1947–1976)
 9 April – How Does Your Garden Grow?  (1947–Present)
 2 November – Round Britain Quiz (1947–Present)
 PC 49 (1947–1953)

Continuing radio programmes

1930s
 In Town Tonight (1933–1960)

1940s
 Music While You Work (1940–1967)
 Sunday Half Hour (1940–2018)
 Desert Island Discs (1942–Present)
 Family Favourites (1945–1980)
 Down Your Way (1946–1992)
 Have A Go (1946–1967)
 Housewives' Choice (1946–1967)
 Letter from America (1946–2004)
 Woman's Hour (1946–Present)

Births
1 March – Mike Read, DJ
28 June – Gerry Northam, radio presenter
10 May – Laurie Macmillan, Scottish-born radio newsreader and continuity announcer (died 2001)
20 May – Greg Dyke, journalist and broadcaster, Director-General of the BBC
5 November – Steve Hodson, actor
20 November – Marilyn Imrie, Scottish theatre and radio drama director and producer (died 2020)
Alistair Beaton, Scottish-born satirist, scriptwriter and radio presenter
Natalie Wheen, arts presenter
Peter White, blind radio presenter

Deaths
 24 July – Ernest Austin, composer, arranger and songwriter associated with the Proms (born 1874)

See also 
 1947 in British music
 1947 in British television
 1947 in the United Kingdom
 List of British films of 1947

References 

 
Years in British radio
Radio